Logsdail is a surname. Notable people with the surname include: 

 Leonard Logsdail (born 1950), British  tailor
 Nicholas Logsdail (born 1945), British art dealer
 William Logsdail (1859–1944), English artist